Rajesh Khattar (born 24 September 1966) is an Indian actor, voice artist and screenwriter from Bollywood. He was married to Neelima Azeem and is the father of actor Ishaan Khattar and step father of Shahid Kapoor.

Personal life
Khattar was born on 24 September 1966. He was married to actress Neelima Azeem in 1990 who is also Shahid Kapoor's mother. They have a son, Ishaan Khatter, who is an actor. Khattar and Azeem got divorced in the year 2001. Khattar married Vandana Sajnani in 2008. Their first child, a boy, Vanraj Khattar, was born in August 2019 after 11 years of marriage.

Career
As a film actor, Khattar 
worked in Hindi films like Don, Don 2, Khiladi 786, Race 2, the Satish Kaushik-directed Gang of Ghosts, Manjunath and Traffic. Khattar also appeared in English and other language TV series and TV films such as Sharpe's Peril, the French series Fais pas ci, fais pas ça and German movie Gift (2017) directed by Daniel Harrich.

Khattar returned to television after 8 years with Beyhadh as Ashwin Mehrotra on Sony TV, followed by Kya Qusoor Hai Amala Ka? as Rishaan Malik on Star Plus. He also featured in Vikram Bhatt's Spotlight on Viu. In 2018, Khattar portrayed the role of Harshvardhan Hooda in Colors TV's Bepannah.

Dubbing career
He has dubbed for numerous Hollywood actors including Tom Hanks, Johnny Depp, Jack Black, Robert Downey Jr., Dominic West, Nicolas Cage, Lambert Wilson and Michael Fassbender. He has been the official Hindi voice of MCU's Tony Stark/Iron Man play by  Downey Jr. for which he is well known.

Filmography

Films

Television

Voice acting credits

Live action films

Indian films

Foreign language films

Animated films

Television

Other production staff
Live action films

Awards and nominations

See also
Dubbing (filmmaking)
List of Indian Dubbing Artists

References

External links

1966 births
Living people
Male actors in Hindi cinema
21st-century Indian male actors
Indian male voice actors